Ceredigion is a large rural county in West Wales. It has a long coastline of Cardigan Bay to the west and the remote moorland of the Cambrian Mountains in the east, with the mountainous terrain of Plynlimon in the northeast. Ceredigion has a total of 264 scheduled monuments. That is too many to have on a single list page, so for convenience the list is divided into the 163 prehistoric sites (shown below) and the 101 Roman to modern sites. Included on this page are 13 Neolithic and Bronze Age standing stones and 3 stone circles. There are a large and diverse variety of burial cairns, mounds and barrows, mainly from the Bronze Age and mainly on the eastern uplands, accounting for some 79 sites. A further 70 defensive Iron Age sites such as hillforts and enclosures are found across the county. Ceredigion is both a unitary authority and a historic county. Historically the county was called Cardiganshire. Between 1974 and 1996 it was merged with Carmarthenshire and Pembrokeshire to form Dyfed.

All the Roman, early medieval, medieval and modern sites are listed at List of Scheduled Roman to modern Monuments in Ceredigion

Scheduled monuments (SAMs) have statutory protection.  It is illegal to disturb the ground surface or any standing remains. The compilation of the list is undertaken by Cadw Welsh Historic Monuments, which is an executive agency of the National Assembly of Wales. The list of scheduled monuments below is supplied by Cadw with additional material from RCAHMW and Dyfed Archaeological Trust.

Prehistoric scheduled monuments in Ceredigion

See also
List of Scheduled Roman to modern Monuments in Ceredigion
List of Cadw properties
List of castles in Wales
List of hill forts in Wales
Historic houses in Wales
List of monastic houses in Wales
List of museums in Wales
List of Roman villas in Wales

References
Coflein is the online database of RCAHMW: Royal Commission on the Ancient and Historical Monuments of Wales, DAT is the Dyfed Archaeological Trust, Cadw is the Welsh Historic Monuments Agency

Ceredigion
Buildings and structures in Ceredigion
 Ceredigion